Gabriele Casella (born 23 June 1994) is an Italian kickboxer. He is the former WAKO World Light Heavyweight champion, the former WMO World Light Heavyweight champion, and two time Italian national champion.

Kickboxing and muay thai career

Early career
Casella made his professional debut against Giuseppe D'Amuri at The Night Of The Wolf 2 on May 25, 2013. He won the fight by a first-round knockout. After stopping Roman Kozac in the second round at Kombat Night VI on July 5, 2013, Casella was booked to face Martin Meoni for the Federkombat -75kg Muaythai title at Grand Prix Roma 2013 on November 16, 2013. He won the fight by unanimous decision.

Casella faced the former two-time World Boxing Council Muaythai European champion Wendy Annonay at Grande Soirée de la Boxe on March 14, 2015. He won the fight by a unanimous decision.

He fought Peemai Jitmuangnon in September 2015, during The Circle. He won the fight by a unanimous decision. He fought another Thai athlete, Sor Klinmee, 10 months later, and won by a first round KO.

WAKO Pro Light heavyweight champion
Casella faced Grégory Grossi for the WAKO-Pro World K-1 Light Heavyweight title at Monte-Carlo Fighting Masters on June 24, 2016. He won the five round affair by a unanimous decision.

Casella faced Lawrence Smithen for the WMO World Light Heavyweight title at Monte-Carlo Fighting Masters on April 29, 2017. He won the fight by unanimous decision.

He fought outside of Europe for the first time on June 10, 2017, at Kunlun Fight 62, as he was booked to face Artur Kyshenko. He lost the fight by a unanimous decision.

Casella was booked to face Rémy Vectol at Thai Fight Rome on April 21, 2018. He won the fight by a first-round technical knockout. 

Casella was afterwards scheduled to make his Bellator Kickboxing debut against Alexandru Negrea at Bellator Rome on July 14, 2018. He won the fight by unanimous decision. Casella made his second appearance under the Bellator banner against Dani Taore at Bellator Kickboxing 11 on December 1, 2018.

Casella was scheduled to face the former WKN Cruiserweight champion Corentin Jallon at Fighting Spirit 7 on April 27, 2019. He won the fight by unanimous decision.

Casella faced Nikos Provias at Fighting Spirit 2022 on March 23, 2022, following a three-year absence from the sport of kickboxing. He won the fight by a second-round technical knockout.

Boxing career
Casella took part in the 2019 Italian national boxing championship, by competing in the heavyweight division. He beat Alessandro Gaglianese by referee stoppage in the first round, Gianluca Rosciglione by points in the quarterfinals and Domenico Norvetta by referee stoppage in the semifinals. These three victories earned him the right to face Davide Brito in the tournament finals, who Casella won the fight by points.

Casella fought with the Italian national boxing team at the Castellon de la Plan. He was scheduled to face Enmanuel Reyes of the Spanish team on the fifth day of the competition, on October 10, 2020. Reyes won the fight by unanimous decision.

Championships and accomplishments

Professional
Federazione Italiana Kickboxing
2013 Federkombat -75kg Muaythai Championship
2015 Federkombat -81kg Muaythai Championship
World Association of Kickboxing Organizations
2016 WAKO-Pro World K-1 Light Heavyweight Championship
World Muaythai Organization
2017 WMO World Light Heavyweight Championship

Amateur
World Association of Kickboxing Organizations
2012 WAKO World Junior Championships Full Contact -75kg 
2014 WAKO European Championships Full Contact -81kg 
2015 WAKO World Championships K-1 -86kg

Fight record

|-  bgcolor=""
| 2023-04-22 || ||align=left| Georgios Aposporis|| THAI FIGHT Rome || Rome, Italy ||  ||  || 
|-  bgcolor="#cfc"
| 2022-03-23 ||Win ||align=left| Nikos Provias|| Fighting Spirit 2022 || Rome, Italy || TKO (Punches) || 2 || 0:47
|-  bgcolor="#cfc"
| 2019-04-27 ||Win ||align=left| Corentin Jallon || Fighting Spirit 7 || Rome, Italy || Decision (Unanimous) || 3 || 3:00
|-  bgcolor="#cfc"
| 2018-12-01 ||Win ||align=left| Dani Taore || Bellator Kickboxing 11 || Rome, Italy || Decision (Unanimous) || 3 || 3:00
|-  bgcolor="#cfc"
| 2018-07-14 ||Win ||align=left| Alexandru Negrea || Bellator Rome || Rome, Italy || Decision (Unanimous) || 3 || 3:00
|-  bgcolor="#cfc"
| 2018-04-21 ||Win ||align=left| Rémy Vectol || Thai Fight Rome || Rome, Italy || TKO (Punches) || 1 || 2:18
|-  bgcolor="#fbb"
| 2017-06-10 || Loss ||align=left| Artur Kyshenko || Kunlun Fight 62 || Bangkok, Thailand || Decision (Unanimous) || 3 || 3:00
|-  bgcolor="#cfc"
| 2017-04-29 ||Win ||align=left| Lawrence Smithen || Fighting Spirit || Rome, Italy || Decision (Unanimous) || 5 || 3:00
|-
! style=background:white colspan=9 |
|-  bgcolor="#cfc"
| 2016-06-24 ||Win ||align=left| Grégory Grossi || Monte-Carlo Fighting Masters || Monaco || Decision (Unanimous) || 5 || 3:00
|-
! style=background:white colspan=9 |
|-  bgcolor="#cfc"
| 2016-04-30 ||Win ||align=left| Ekapop Sor Klinmee || Fighting Spirit || Rome, Italy || KO (Head kick) || 1 || 1:17
|-  bgcolor="#cfc"
| 2015-09-12 ||Win ||align=left| Peemai Jitmuangnon || The Circle || Barcelona, Spain || Decision (Unanimous) || 3 || 3:00
|-  bgcolor="#cfc"
| 2015-05-17 ||Win ||align=left| Hosan Radwan || Fighting Spirit Muay Thai 4 || Rome, Italy || TKO (Elbow) || 2 || 1:50
|-
! style=background:white colspan=9 |
|-  bgcolor="#cfc"
| 2015-04-12 ||Win ||align=left| Madani Rahmani  || International Fight || Rome, Italy || TKO || 1 ||
|-  bgcolor="#cfc"
| 2015-03-14 ||Win ||align=left| Wendy Annonay || Grande Soirée de la Boxe || Tours, France || Decision (Unanimous) || 3 || 3:00
|-  bgcolor="#cfc"
| 2014-05-16 ||Win ||align=left| Jawad El Byari || Invictus Arena 6 || Rome, Italy || Decision (Unanimous) || 3 || 3:00
|-  bgcolor="#fbb"
| 2014-04-12 ||Loss ||align=left| Francesco Palermo || Knock Out Action 8 || Savignano sul Rubicone, Italy || Decision (Unanimous) || 3 || 3:00
|-  bgcolor="#cfc"
| 2013-11-16 ||Win ||align=left| Martin Meoni || Grand Prix Roma 2013 || Rome, Italy || Decision (Unanimous) || 5 || 3:00
|-
! style=background:white colspan=9 |
|-  bgcolor="#cfc"
| 2013-07-05 ||Win ||align=left| Roman Kozac || Kombat Night VI || Genzano di Roma, Italy || KO || 2 ||
|-  bgcolor="#cfc"
| 2013-05-25 ||Win ||align=left| Giuseppe D'Amuri || The Night Of The Wolf 2 || Taranto, Italy || KO || 1 || 
|-
| colspan=9 | Legend:    

|-  bgcolor="#cfc"
| 2015-10-31 ||Win ||align=left| Samet Keser || 2015 WAKO World Championships, Tournament Final || Belgrade, Serbia || Decision (Unanimous) || 3 || 2:00
|-
! style=background:white colspan=9 |

|-  bgcolor="#cfc"
| 2015-10-30 ||Win ||align=left| Jonatan Dominguez Buendia || 2015 WAKO World Championships, Tournament Semi Final || Belgrade, Serbia || TKO (Left hook) ||  || 

|-  bgcolor="#cfc"
| 2015-10-29 ||Win ||align=left| Kristiyan Georgiev || 2015 WAKO World Championships, Tournament Quarter Final || Belgrade, Serbia || Walk Over||  || 

|-  bgcolor="#cfc"
| 2015-10-28 ||Win ||align=left| Bibola Isaev || 2015 WAKO World Championships, Tournament 1/8 Final|| Belgrade, Serbia || Decision (Unanimous)|| 3 ||2:00 
|-

|-  bgcolor="#cfc"
| 2014-10-25 ||Win ||align=left| Viktor Frohlich || 2014 WAKO European Championships, Tournament Final || Bilbao, Spain || Decision (Unanimous) || 3 || 2:00
|-
! style=background:white colspan=9 |

|-  bgcolor="#cfc"
| 2014-10-24 ||Win ||align=left| Igor Prykhodko || 2014 WAKO European Championships, Tournament Semifinal || Bilbao, Spain || Decision (Unanimous) || 3 || 2:00
|-

| colspan=9 | Legend:

See also
 List of male kickboxers

References

1994 births
Living people
Light heavyweight kickboxers
Italian male kickboxers
Italian Muay Thai practitioners
Sportspeople from Rome